Corymbophyton is a monotypic genus of corals belonging to the monotypic family Corymbophytidae. The only species is Corymbophyton bruuni.

The species is found in Southern Africa.

References

Corymbophytidae
Octocorallia genera
Monotypic cnidarian genera